"The Nightmare After Krustmas" is the tenth episode of the twenty-eighth season of the American animated television series The Simpsons, and the 606th episode of the series overall. It aired in the United States on Fox on December 11, 2016.

Plot
At the First Church of Springfield, very few people are present for Reverend Lovejoy's service on the fourth Sunday of Advent. His wife Helen calls him afterwards to meet a 'fan club' which is actually an intervention by Ned Flanders, Agnes Skinner, Sideshow Mel and Lovejoy's boss The Parson (a caricature of Bing Crosby) who introduce him to the Patriarch, who demands he bring more people to the church.

Meanwhile, a pagan festival is held in town, with the Simpson family and others attending. Theo Jansen shows his feature attraction: the Strandbeest, a wind-powered sculpture, which goes wild and tramples Krusty the Clown, who was ice-skating with his daughter Sophie, whom he only sees during the holidays. At Springfield General Hospital, the Jewish Krusty tries to bond with his daughter, but finds out her mother raised her Christian and that she wants to celebrate Christmas. Seeing their discomfort, Marge invites the pair to spend Christmas with the Simpsons.

Back at home, Marge brings Maggie a 'Gnome in Your Home' (a parody of The Elf on the Shelf), a gnome that is supposed to watch over her and tell Santa Claus what she has been doing; Maggie does not sleep and Homer tells her that if she is not good, the 'Gnome in Your Home' will nibble off her fingers. Krusty arrives at the Simpson home, but brings in a television crew to record it as a television special, angering Sophie to the point of her sending him away. 

Meanwhile, after failing to convert Dewey Largo and Apu Nahasapeemapetilon, Reverend Lovejoy goes to Moe's Tavern and encounters Krusty, whom he successfully converts after Krusty mistakes Snake being tased through the window for an image of Jesus Christ. That night, Maggie has a nightmare in which the Gnome attacks Maggie after Homer moves her crib closer to him. He then evilly talks to her, spits out finger tips and scares her so much she finds herself at the North Pole where she meets Santa Claus, Jack Frost, the Abominable Snowman and Wayne Gretzky. They tell her they will defeat the Gnome, but he has a gun and they all run off. Maggie enters a cave which turns into the Gnome's head and eats her. Maggie is woken up from her dream by Marge to find it is Christmas. Marge says the Gnome told her she has been good, and to her horror, she says they will leave him in her room all year around.

During the Christmas church service, Lovejoy introduces the newly converted Krusty, and Sophie, seeing the change, is happy. Back at home, Maggie opens her present to find out it is a 'Mrs. Gnome in Your Home'. In their bedroom that night, Marge surprises Homer by wearing a "Christmas costume", but as they get into bed, they find that under the covers are parts from 'Mr. and Mrs. Gnome in Your Home', all cut to several pieces, while Maggie finally goes to sleep happy.

During Krusty’s show, Sideshow Mel introduces the "Krusty the Clown Sober Contemplation Hour", where Krusty shows how much the conversion has changed him and his show, including "Itchy and Scratchy", to the disappointment of the kids in the audience.

Krusty prepares for his baptism in a river, and while approaching Lovejoy, he cracks the ice and falls underneath. In a hallucination, he is visited by the ghosts of his father Rabbi Hyman Krustofsky and his first agent (who initially appears in the form of Olaf and Sven from Frozen) in an ice castle. He talks with his father about his conversion and his role as a father. He is saved by Lovejoy who is praised as a savior and many people return to church for his service. Krusty goes back to being Jewish.

In the final montage, Sideshow Mel's wife leaves him and Maggie destroys more Gnomes. During the credits, the Christian God and the Jewish God argue in Heaven over whether Krusty successfully received baptism by falling underwater, but are interrupted by a drunk Ahura Mazda, God of Zoroastrianism who had been referenced earlier in the episode. Krusty and Sophie sing together while being carried by the Strandbeest on the snow.

Production
With this episode, Wayne Gretzky became the first hockey player to lend his voice to The Simpsons. He had been written in an early draft of the season six episode "Lisa on Ice" but was eventually cut.

Reception
Dennis Perkins of The A.V. Club gave the episode a B−, saying "There's nothing wrong with the idea in theory—Dan Castellaneta and Harry Shearer always sink their teeth into Krusty's ravenous fame-grubbing and Lovejoy's sepulchral sententiousness, respectively, with enthusiasm. And a B-character taking the wheel for an episode can be a spur to fresh storytelling. But, while there's a bracingly irreverent take on religion throughout the episode, the Lovejoy and Krusty show isn't especially compelling on its own."

Tony Sokol of Den of Geek gave "The Nightmare After Krustmas" 4.5 stars, stating, "'The Nightmare After Krustmas' gives us everything except a non-denominational seasonal special, but is a present anyone can open...(A)lmost every line is a skewered shot of eggnog spiked with subversive holiday cheer. Even the setups. The visual gags are aplenty and the whole episode is lit with wit."

"The Nightmare After Krustmas" scored a 2.3 rating with an 8 share and was watched by 5.60 million viewers, making it Fox's highest rated show of the night.

References

External links
 

2016 American television episodes
American Christmas television episodes
The Simpsons (season 28) episodes